Frank Jacob is a German bobsledder and bobsleigh coach.

Jacob was a bobsleigh coach at 2014 Winter Olympics. He won a bronze medal in Bobsleigh and Skeleton European Championship 1991.

References

German male bobsledders
Living people
Year of birth missing (living people)
Place of birth missing (living people)